Bonifacio Castillo Cruz (born 1 November 1964) is a Mexican politician and chemical engineer graduated from the University Veracruzana. He is a member of PT. He has been municipal president of Papantla in the 1998-2000 triennium and federal deputy in the LVIII Legislature (2000-2003). He was a State and National Councilor of the PRD, resigned from that party in 2009. He is currently the coordinator of the PT Veracruz Organization appointed by the National Executive Committee of that Party.

Political career 

Bonifacio Castillo Cruz, Course the Degree in Chemical Engineering, at the Veracruzana University from 1982-1987, after finishing his professional career, he was a member of the PFCRN where he worked as an Electoral Propaganda distributor and fence painter in the city of Papantla Promoting the candidacy of Rafael Aguilar Talamantes to the Presidency of the Republic in 1994, he was also caretaker of Casilla of the PFCRN. 2 years later in 1996 he was president of the Organization of Papanteca Indigenous Communities (OCIP) where he defended the indigenous people of the Sierra Papanteca. In that same year he joined the PRD and was elected as a candidate for the Municipal Presidency and wins the municipal elections, becoming Municipal President of his native Papantla during the 1998-2000 triennium, with fines since 1999 he asks for a license to seek the Candidacy. for the Federal Council, and in the 2000 elections with 43,118 votes, the Federal Council won and became the First Left Federal Deputy of District VI Papantla of the Coalition Alianza por México. Finishing his legislative task in 2003, he entered the Council of State of the PRD in the state of Veracruz, that same year he was elected National Councilor of the Party and moved to Mexico City, to join the National Council of the PRD until 2006. In 2006 the Broad Progressive Front appointed him Representative of the Government Legitimate of AMLO. A year later in 2007 he was appointed National Delegate of the PRD representing Veracruz. Castillo, due to the internal problems of the PRD, resigned his membership in 2009 to join the Labor Party (PT) where he served as Coordinator of the Together We Will Make History Coalition in 2018. He currently serves as Organization Coordinator of the PT in the city of Papantla, which placed him as a Candidate for Local Deputy for District VI with head in the city of Papantla, resulting in the winner of the election on June 6, 2021, for which he becomes an Elected Local Deputy.

Electoral Propaganda Distributor 1994 

Caretaker of Casilla 1994 PFCRN 

Pdte. From OCIP 1996 

Municipal President 1998-2000  

Federal Deputy 2000-2003  

Pre-candidate for the Governor of Veracruz 2003 

State Councilor  2003-2004 

National Councilor  2004-2006 

Representative of the Legitimate Government 2006

National Delegate  2007-2009 

State Councilor of the PT 2016-2017

Coalition Coordinator Together We Will Make History 2018 

Organizational Coordinator of PT 2021. 

Local Deputy 2021-2024

References

1964 births
Living people
Politicians from Veracruz
Members of the Chamber of Deputies (Mexico)
Party of the Democratic Revolution politicians
20th-century Mexican politicians
21st-century Mexican politicians
Mexican chemical engineers
Municipal presidents in Veracruz
Universidad Veracruzana alumni
Members of the Congress of Veracruz
Deputies of the LVIII Legislature of Mexico